In mathematics, a Kline sphere characterization, named after John Robert Kline, is a topological characterization of a two-dimensional sphere in terms of what sort of subset separates it.  Its proof was one of the first notable accomplishments of R. H. Bing;  Bing gave an alternate proof using brick partitioning in his paper Complementary domains of continuous curves 

A simple closed curve in a two-dimensional sphere (for instance, its equator) separates the sphere into two pieces upon removal.  If one removes a pair of points from a sphere, however, the remainder is connected.  Kline's sphere characterization states that the converse is true:  If a nondegenerate locally connected metric continuum is separated by any simple closed curve but by no pair of points, then it is a two-dimensional sphere.

References

Bing, R. H., The Kline sphere characterization problem, Bulletin of the American Mathematical Society 52  (1946), 644–653.

Theorems in topology
Topology